Bantham Cross is a tiny hamlet near Churchstow, in Devon, England. There are a few buildings in it, and a roundabout. The buildings are sparse and are part of Elston, Offields, Osborne Newton and Nuckwell farms.

References

Villages in Devon